Jiang County or Jiangxian is a county in the south of Shanxi province, China. It is under the administration of Yuncheng city.

It is the site of a necropolis at Hengbei dating to the Zhou dynasty.

Climate

References

External links
www.xzqh.org 

County-level divisions of Shanxi